Heinrich XXIV, Count Reuss of Köstritz (26 July 1681 in Schleiz — 24 July 1748 in Greiz) was Count Reuss of Köstritz from 1692 to his death. He was the founder of the Reuss-Köstritz line of the House of Reuss.

Marriage and issues 
On 6 May 1704, Heinrich XXIV married Baroness Eleonore of Promnitz-Dittersbach. They had following children:
 Heinrich V (1706–1713)
 Heinrich VI (1707–1783)
 Heinrich VIII (1708–1710)
 Luise (1710–1756)
 Heinrich IX (1711–1780)
 Sophia (1712–1781)
 Heinrich X (1715–1741)
 Conradina Eleonora (1719–1770), married Heinrich XI of Greiz in 1743
 Heinrich XXIII (1722–1787)

References 
Thomas Gehrlein: Das Haus Reuss. Älterer und Jüngerer Linie, Börde Verlag, 2006, 
Friedrich Wilhelm Trebge: Spuren im Land, Hohenleuben, 2005

1681 births
1748 deaths
Counts of Reuss
People from the Principality of Reuss-Greiz